The Little Brothers of Jesus Caritas (abbreviated and stylised jc) are a male religious congregation of the Catholic Church. They follow the life and inspiration of Saint Charles de Foucauld.

History 
The Little Brothers of Jesus Caritas were officially recognised in 1969 by the Bishop of Foligno. It was founded under the leadership of Gian Carlo Sibilia, who was mentored and guided by Carlo Carretto, himself a member of the Little Brothers of the Gospel.

In 1979, the use of Sassovivo Abbey was handed over to the congregation.

At Carretto's death in 1988, he willed his archive to the custody of the congregation, and it is presently kept at Sassovivo Abbey.

On 21 July 2017, the congregation elected Paolo Maria Barducci to succeed Sibilia as prior of the congregation.

On 31 July 2017, Gabriele Faraghini, a priest of the congregation, was appointed by Pope Francis as rector of the Pontifical Roman Major Seminary.

Organisation

Locations 
The Little Brothers of Jesus Caritas have three houses:

 Spello, Italy — mother house of the congregation
 Sassovivo, Italy — in a former Benedictine abbey
 Nazareth, Israel — in a house once owned by Charles de Foucauld
From 1990 to July 2021, the congregation also resided in the Abbey of San Guglielmo al Goleto.

List of priors 
 1969–2017: Gian Carlo Sibilia
 2017–present: Paolo Maria Barducci

Activity 
The daily routine of the Little Brothers of Jesus Caritas includes Mass and the Liturgy of the Hours, as well as manual labour and providing pastoral services to parishes. They also host retreatants that temporarily live with the community.

The congregation typically lives in small communities.

The congregation also publishes a periodical titled Jesus Caritas.

See also 

 Little Brothers of Jesus
 Little Brothers of the Gospel

References

External links 

 

Catholic orders and societies
Catholic religious institutes established in the 20th century